Felimare sechurana is a species of sea slug or dorid nudibranch, a marine gastropod mollusc in the family Chromodorididae.

Distribution 

Description
This species was previously identified as Felimare ghiselini, a synonym of Felimare californiensis. It is dark blue in colour densely covered with orange spots on the mantle and foot and with pale blue-white spots scattered between the orange spots or merging at the mantle and foot edges. It reaches  in length.

References

Chromodorididae
Gastropods described in 2017